The Tyler School of Art and Architecture is based at Temple University, a large, urban, public research university in Philadelphia, Pennsylvania. Tyler currently enrolls about 1,350 undergraduate students and about 200 graduate students in a wide variety of academic degree programs, including architecture, art education, art history, art therapy, ceramics, city and regional planning, community arts practices, community development, facilities management, fibers and material studies, glass, graphic and interactive design, historic preservation, horticulture, landscape architecture, metals/jewelry/CAD-CAM, painting, photography, printmaking, sculpture and visual studies.

Founded in 1935 by Stella Elkins Tyler and sculptor Boris Blai in nearby Elkins Park, Pennsylvania, Tyler moved to a new, 255,000-square-foot facility at Temple's Main Campus in 2009 with the cornerstone financial support of an allocation of $61.5 million from the Commonwealth of Pennsylvania. In 2012, Tyler's Architecture programs moved into a new facility connected to the main Tyler building. Temple's programs in Landscape Architecture and Horticulture (based primarily at Temple's suburban Ambler Campus) and its programs in Main Campus-based City & Regional Planning and Community Development programs joined Tyler in 2016, unifying all of the university's architecture and environmental design disciplines in one school for the first time.

In 2017, arts administrator, art historian and curator Susan E. Cahan, formerly associate dean and dean for the arts at Yale College at Yale University, was appointed dean of the Tyler School of Art and Architecture by Temple President Richard M. Englert.

In 2018, Temple University's board of trustees approved changes to Tyler's structure and identity in order to unify the school, integrate disciplines in architecture and environmental design, support cross-disciplinary studies and reflect current understanding of creative practice and research. On July 1, 2019, the school's name officially expanded from the Tyler School of Art to the Tyler School of Art and Architecture.

Academic programs and accreditation 
The Tyler School of Art and Architecture offers a wide range of degree and certificate programs in the areas of art, architecture and environmental design, graphic design, art history and art education.

Susan E. Cahan, has been Tyler's dean since 2017.

Tyler's academic degree programs:

Architecture (BSArch, MArch, MSArch)
Art Education (BSEd, BFA with Art Education Concentration, BSEd, MEd with Major in Art Education)
Art History (BA, MA, MA Fine Arts Administration Track, PhD)
Art Therapy (BA)
Ceramics (BFA, MFA)
City & Regional Planning (MS)
Community Development (BS)
Facilities Management (BS)
Facilities Planning (MS)
Fibers & Material Studies (BFA, MFA)
Foundations (non-degree granting program for first-year students)
Glass (BFA, MFA)
Graphic & Interactive Design (BFA, MFA)
Historic Preservation (BS)
Horticulture (BSHort, ASHort)
Landscape Architecture (BSLA, MLArch)
Metals/Jewelry/CAD-CAM (BFA, MFA)
Painting (BFA, MFA)
Photography (BFA, MFA)
Printmaking (BFA, MFA)
Sculpture (BFA, MFA)
Visual Studies (BA)

Temple also has a BA in Art program at Temple University, Japan Campus, located in Tokyo.

The Tyler School of Art and Architecture at Temple University is a non-profit, accredited member of the National Association of Schools of Art and Design and the Middle States Association of Colleges and Schools. Tyler's MArch degree program is accredited by the National Architectural Accrediting Board, and the school's BLArch and MLArch programs are accredited by the National Landscape Architecture Board and the Landscape Architecture Accreditation Board. Tyler's MS program in City and Regional Planning is accredited by the Planning Accreditation Board. The BS program in Facilities Management is accredited by the International Facilities Management Association.

Facilities 
In 2009 Tyler School of Art moved to a new location, a 255,000-square-foot building designed by architect Carlos Jiménez, Tyler's architecture program moved into a new, 50,000-square-foot Architecture Building in 2012. The two structures, which are connected by a passageway and are located at Temple University's Main Campus in Philadelphia. Their location adjacent to Presser Hall (part of Temple University's Boyer College of Music and Dance) and Temple Theaters (part of Temple's School of Theater, Film and Media Arts) has created an arts quadrant in the northeast corner of campus.

Visiting artists and scholars 
Tyler also hosts a variety of visiting artist, architect and scholar programs that bring leaders in their disciplines to the school to address the Tyler community and work with students in their classrooms and studios. Flagship visiting artist and scholar programs include:

The Jack Wolgin Annual Visiting Artist Symposium, an endowed visiting artist program that brings artists and thinkers to campus to work with Tyler students and present a free public lecture each year. Past Jack Wolgin Annual Visiting Artists:

 Judy Pfaff (2016)
 LaToya Ruby Frazier (2017)
 Rick Lowe (2018)
 Nick Cave (2019)
 Cecilia Vicuña (2020)
 Jennie C. Jones (2022)
Tyler Architecture alumni endowed a lecture series to honor Brigitte Knowles, professor emerita and former associate dean, that brings architects, landscape architects and designers to campus. Past lecturers include:

 David Adjaye, Founder and Principal, Adjaye Associates
 Craig Edward Dykers, Founding Partner, Snøhetta
 Walter Hood, Founder, Hood Design Studio
 Clive Wilkinson, President, Clive Wilkinson Architects 
 Sharon Johnston, Founding Partner, Johnston Marklee
 Olalekan Jeyifous (2022)

Temple Contemporary 
Temple Contemporary is Tyler's exhibitions and public programs unit. It was led by founding director Robert Blackson, Tyler's director of exhibitions and public programming from 2011 to 2021. Jova Lynne, formerly the Senior Curator of the Museum of Contemporary Art Detroit, was hired as the Director of Temple Contemporary in 2021. Temple Contemporary's galleries and offices are located in the Tyler building at Temple University's Main Campus, although much of its programming takes place in the surrounding Philadelphia community.

Temple Contemporary's community-focused programming that has earned national attention includes "Funeral for a Home" (2014), an extended commemoration of at-risk urban housing stock and the lives that soon-to-be-demolished homes contain; "reForm" (2014-2015), a response to the closure of public schools and its impact on urban communities and their children by artist and Tyler faculty member Pepón Osorio; and "Symphony for a Broken Orchestra" (2017-2018), a citywide effort to collect, display, repair and return broken instruments belonging to Philadelphia's public schools, highlighted by the composition of music for the broken instruments by composer David Lang and the music's performance by a diverse orchestra of local residents. All three of the projects above were funded in part by the Pew Center for Arts & Heritage.

Notable alumni 

Dennis Adams, artist
Polly Apfelbaum, artist
Timothy App, painter
Bill Beckley, artist
Stanley Bleifeld, sculptor
Moe Brooker, artist
Harriete Estel Berman, artist
Karen Boccalero, artist, nun
Regis Brodie, artist, Skidmore faculty member
Donald Camp, photographer, Ursinus faculty member
Syd Carpenter, artist, 2022 Gallery of Success honoree
Barbara Chase-Riboud, artist, novelist, poet
Manon Cleary, painter
Cecelia Condit, artist, Wisconsin-Milwaukee faculty member
Chuck Connelly, painter
Marsha Cottrell, artist
Amber Cowan, artist
Harvey Dinnerstein, painter, educator
Alix Dobkin, singer-songwriter
Angela Dufresne, painter, RISD faculty member
 Allan Edmunds, printmaker
Anoka Faruqee, painter, Yale faculty member
Louise Fishman, painter
 Jean Foos, artist
Peter Fox, artist
Allan Randall Freelon, artist
Nick Fudge, artist
Doreen Garner, artist
Frank Gaylord, sculptor
Neil Goodman, sculptor, educator
Deborah Grant, artist
Trenton Doyle Hancock, artist
Edgar Heap of Birds, artist
Jessica Hische, illustrator, designer
Catherine Jansen, photographer
Martha Jackson Jarvis, artist
Irvin Kershner, film director
Simmie Knox, painter
David Levine, artist, illustrator
Stacy Levy, sculptor
E. B. Lewis, illustrator
Beth Lipman, glass artist
Deborah Margo, artist
Joan Marter, art historian, Rutgers faculty member
Steven Montgomery, artist
Judy Moonelis, ceramic artist
Ayanah Moor, artist, SAIC faculty member
Jim Morphesis, painter
Ree Morton, artist
Eleanor Moty, metalsmith, jewelry artist
Nicholas Muellner, photographer, writer
Lowell Blair Nesbitt, artist
Albert Paley, artist
Laura Parnes, artist
 Marlo Pascual, photographer
Janet Perr, designer, art director
Amy Pleasant, painter
Eric Pryor, President of Pennsylvania Academy of the Fine Arts
Erin M. Riley, artist
Paula Scher, designer
Susan Sensemann, artist
James Sheehan, artist
Lorraine Shemesh, artist
Sarai Sherman, painter
Sondra Sherman, painter, jewelry artist
Aaron Shikler, painter
Lisa Sigal, artist
Laurie Simmons, photographer
Nina Sobell, artist
Andrew Spence, artist
Kara Springer, artist
John Stango, artist
Richard Sylbert, production designer
Patricia Renee' Thomas, painter, draftswoman, and art educator
Linda Threadgill, artist
William Villalongo, artist
Diana Vincent, jewelry artist
Angela Washko, artist
Hannah Wilke, sculptor, photographer
Lisa Yuskavage, painter
Paul O. Zelinsky, author, illustrator
Syd Carpenter, artist

Notable current and past faculty 

Adela Akers, textile and fiber artist
Philip Betancourt, archaeologist and art historian
 Doug Bucci, metals artist
Richard Callner, painter
 Jon F. Clark, glass artist
 Richard Cramer, painter
John E. Dowell Jr., printmaker
Coco Fusco, artist
Mark Thomas Gibson, artist
Hermann Gundersheimer, art historian
 Marcia B. Hall, art historian
 Jesse Harrod, fiber artist
 Amy Hauft, sculptor
C.T. Jasper, artist
 Nicholas Kripal, sculptor 
Stanley Lechtzin, jewelry and metals artist
Roberto Lugo, ceramic artist
Winifred Lutz, sculptor
Keith Anthony Morrison, artist
Dona Nelson, painter
Odili Donald Odita, painter
Karyn Olivier, artist
Pepón Osorio, artist
Gerda Panofsky-Soergel, art historian
David Pease, painter
Rudolf Staffel, ceramic artist
Robert Storr (art academic), art historian
Stanley Whitney, painter

History 
Arts patron Stella Elkins Tyler (of the Elkins/Widener family) donated her estate in Elkins Park, Pennsylvania, to Temple University in the early 1930s. With an interest in progressive education and a deep appreciation of her mentor, the sculptor Boris Blai, Tyler offered her estate with the expressed wish that, through Boris Blai, it would become an environment for the advancement of the fine arts, scholarly study in the arts and individual creativity. As founding dean of what was then known as the Stella Elkins Tyler School of Fine Arts, Blai instilled the school with a commitment to progressive education emphasizing the student's mastery of technique within the framework of a liberal arts curriculum. Blai insisted upon individual attention to each student's needs as the basis of successful teaching. During his 25-year tenure as dean, Blai shaped the school into one of the finest visual arts centers in the country, and his founding ideals still remain paramount to Tyler's educational philosophy.

In 1960, Charles Le Clair succeeded Blai. Under Le Clair, the Tyler campus was improved with construction of a residence hall and two studio/classroom buildings. In 1966, the school's name was changed to the Tyler School of Art, and Le Clair founded the Tyler Study Abroad program in Rome, Italy. Tyler's programs at Temple University Rome remain among the most respected fine arts study abroad programs in Europe today. Temple University Rome has expanded to include a full range of liberal arts, architecture, business and law courses with an emphasis on those relating to Rome, Italy and Europe. Throughout the 1960s and 1970s, Tyler's curriculum continued to grow in response to new definitions of art-making and the role of art in society. New programs and modern facilities in design, ceramics, glass, metals and photography were added. During this time, Tyler established Art History and Art Education departments on Temple's Main Campus in Philadelphia.

The pace of change and growth began to accelerate dramatically in the late 1990s. In 1998, Tyler opened Temple's Department of Architecture. In 2009, Tyler moved from Elkins Park into a new, 250,000-square-foot building at Temple's Main Campus. Three years later, Architecture moved into a new 50,000-square-foot facility connected to the new Tyler building. Temple's programs in landscape architecture, horticulture, city and regional planning, and community development became part of Tyler in 2016, for the first time unifying all of the architecture and environmental design disciplines at Temple in one academic unit. In 2017, Susan E. Cahan, who came from Yale University became the first permanent dean of an independent Tyler since the school moved into its new building in 2009. On July 1, 2019, more than 20 years after Architecture at Temple became part of Tyler, the school's name officially became the Tyler School of Art and Architecture.

Tyler's leaders:

 Boris Blai, dean (1935-1960)
 Charles Le Clair, dean (1960-1974)
Donald M. Lantzy, acting dean (1974-1975)
Jack Wasserman, dean (1975-1977)
 David Pease, interim dean (1977-1978) and dean (1978-1984)
George Bayliss, dean (1984-1989)
 Rochelle Toner, dean (1989-2002)
 Hester Stinnett, acting dean (2002-2005)
 Keith Anthony Morrison, dean (2005-2008)
 Therese Dolan, interim dean (2008-2009)
 Robert Stroker, interim dean and dean of Center for the Arts (2009-2015)
 Hester Stinnett, interim dean (2015-2017)
 Susan E. Cahan, dean (2017–present)

References

External links
 

Art schools in Pennsylvania
Temple University
Universities and colleges in Philadelphia
Educational institutions established in 1935
1935 establishments in Pennsylvania
Templetown, Philadelphia
Art museums and galleries in Philadelphia
Arts organizations established in 1935